Geekadelphia was a Philadelphia-based weblog focused on entertainment, science, technology and other related areas pertaining to the city of Philadelphia. Founded in 2007, the blog also co-hosted the Philadelphia Geek Awards with the Academy of Natural Sciences of Drexel University. From early 2020, the site was no longer online. The site ceased operation in November 2017, and it is no longer online.

History
Geekadelphia was founded by Tim Quirino and Eric Smith in 2007, who, according to Smith, "wanted a place to ramble about things that interested us and have a site to host whatever silly videos we'd make." Smith stated in 2008 that he did not expect much financial gain from the site and that the amount of revenue earned only gave enough to pay for hosting. He expressed interest in throwing more events on behalf of the site and announced a podcast with Benjamin Gilbert and a webcomic.

In 2013, Quirino, along with Smith, developed a new branding and logo system for the site, in tandem with their decision to incorporate their company, Analog Boys. Mikey Ilagan, previously a contributing writer, became editor-in-chief in December 2013. Quirino later left for San Francisco in 2014 to work as a designer for Facebook.

The End

On November 30, 2017, the site posted a blog titled 'You're Still Here? Go Home' explaining how the site has come to an end.

Events
Since its inception, the site has hosted various events within Philadelphia. In 2008, the site hosted a Battlestar Galactica-themed party in Old City with The Hacktory, a Philadelphia-based organization promoting the application of technology in the arts, and Indy Hall. The site's staff decorated the Trocadero Theatre for the screenings of Jennifer's Body in 2009 and Zombieland in 2010. The screening for Jennifer's Body was to a packed audience.

Philadelphia Geek Awards
In 2011, Smith and Quirino founded the Philadelphia Geek Awards, in conjunction with the Academy of Natural Sciences of Drexel University, to honor and celebrate achievements within the Philadelphia community. Its second annual ceremony, hosted at the university, was reported to have sold over 400 in a few minutes. During its third-annual ceremony, Smith stated his criteria for geek as "more about having a hobby or a side project that you feel really passionate about, that you care so much about that you pour yourself into it." The organizers "retired" the Awards as of August 2018, citing "it was a struggle to keep the event funded well enough operate".

References

links
Geekadelphia Blog (archived link by WebArchive, January 2019) 

American entertainment websites
Science blogs
Technology blogs
Internet properties established in 2007
Organizations based in Philadelphia